Damnacanthal is an anthraquinone isolated from the root of Morinda citrifolia, using water or organic solvents.

Pharmacology
In a 1995 in vitro study, damnacanthal was found to act as a potent and selective inhibitor of p56lck tyrosine kinase.

References 

Hydroxyanthraquinones
Tyrosine kinase inhibitors
Conjugated aldehydes
Phenol ethers
Vinylogous carboxylic acids